Ronald J. "Ron" Canestrari (born May 22, 1943) is an American politician and former Democratic member of the New York State Assembly.

Biography
Canestrari was born on May 22, 1943, in Cohoes. He attended the Christian Brothers Academy in Albany. He graduated B.Sc. from Fordham College in 1965, and J.D. from Fordham University School of Law in 1968. He was an enlisted member of the United States Army from 1969 to 1971, and worked as an attorney for the federal government and the Army.

Canestrari served as mayor of Cohoes from 1976 until 1989. During his tenure as mayor, he was an active member of the New York State Conference of Mayors and served as the organization's president.

He was a member of the New York State Assembly from 1989 to 2012, sitting in the 188th through 199th New York State Legislatures. His district included parts of Albany, Rensselaer and Saratoga counties, sections of the cities of Albany and Troy, and all of the cities of Cohoes and Rensselaer. Canestrari was Chairman of the Higher Education Committee. In 2007, he became Majority Leader of the State Assembly. He ran uncontested in the 2008 and 2010 general elections. On April 9, 2012, he announced that he would not seek re-election later that year.

References 

1943 births
Living people
People from Cohoes, New York
Democratic Party members of the New York State Assembly
Fordham University School of Law alumni
21st-century American politicians